Kostanay Airport  is an airport located  south-west of Kostanay, Kazakhstan. Runways of the airport were changed over 5 months and the airport was reopened on 10 October 2019. Année runway was built. Since the work has been over, there is only flight to the capital Nur-Sultan. Different companies are planning to fly to international destinations or intern destinations.

June 28, 2022 — by the decree of the Government of Kazakhstan, Kostanay International Airport was named after Akhmet Baitursynuly.

Airlines and destinations

References

External links

Airports in Kazakhstan